Anolis otongae is a species of lizard in the family Dactyloidae. The species is found in Ecuador.

References

Anoles
Reptiles described in 2010
Endemic fauna of Ecuador
Reptiles of Ecuador